Aquilino Martin de la Llana Pimentel III (born January 20, 1964), commonly known as Koko Pimentel,  is a Filipino politician and lawyer serving as the Senate Minority Leader since 2022. He has been a Senator since 2011 and previously served as the Senate President of the Philippines from 2016 to 2018. He is also the national chairman of Partido Demokratiko Pilipino–Lakas ng Bayan (PDP–Laban). As the eldest son and third child of the former Senate President Aquilino Pimentel Jr., he is  the first child of a previous Senate president to hold the office. He was sworn in on August 12, 2011, and was proclaimed as the 12th winning senator in the 2007 election. Pimentel was one of the high-ranking public officials who drew flak for breaching the COVID-19 quarantine protocols.

Early life and education
Aquilino Martin de la Llana Pimentel III was born on January 20, 1964, in Cagayan de Oro, Philippines. His parents are Aquilino Pimentel, Jr. and Lourdes de la Llana-Pimentel. His father was a lawyer and dean of law at Xavier University at the time of his birth. The elder Pimentel eventually became a senator.

Pimentel earned his Bachelor of Science degree in Mathematics from Ateneo de Manila University and his Bachelor of Laws from University of the Philippines College of Law. He topped the 1990 Philippine Bar Examinations with a score of 89.85 percent.

Early career

Pimentel began working as a lawyer in 1990, and was commissioner (representing Mindanao) on the National Youth Commission from 1995 to 1998. He was a professor for the University of the East College of Law from 2007 to 2010 and also for the JD–MBA Program of the Ramon V. del Rosario College of Business and Far Eastern University Institute of Law from 2006 until his election to the senate in August 2011. He was conferred Doctor of Humanities honoris causa by the Polytechnic University of the Philippines on May 18, 2012.

Political career

2001 election

Pimentel ran for Cagayan de Oro city mayor in the 2001 elections but lost to Vicente Emano.

2007 election
Running in only his second race in the May 14, 2007 senatorial elections, Pimentel was narrowly defeated by Bukidnon Congressman Miguel Zubiri for the 12th and last slot in the Philippine Senate. The narrow margin of 18,372 votes was  controversial, particularly the votes from the southern Philippine province of Maguindanao, where Pimentel had lost heavily to Zubiri.

Electoral protest

In Philippine senatorial elections, the twelve candidates with the highest number of votes nationwide are elected. In the 2007 elections, Pimentel (Genuine Opposition) and Juan Miguel Zubiri (TEAM Unity) contested the 12th seat.

In the final tally for the 2007 senatorial elections by the Commission on Elections (COMELEC), Zubiri narrowly defeated Pimentel for the 12th and last seat in the Senate. Zubiri had a total of 11,005,866 votes against Pimentel's 10,984,347 votes. On July 14, 2007, Zubiri was proclaimed as the 12th winning senator.

Claiming fraudulent votes in 22 municipalities of Maguindanao, 7 in Lanao del Norte, 3 in Shariff Kabunsuan, 2 in Basilan, 2 in Sultan Kudarat, 4 in Lanao del Sur, and 4 in Sulu, Pimentel petitioned the Supreme Court to issue a restraining order against the proclamation of Zubiri. With the vote tied at 7–7, the Supreme Court dismissed Pimentel's petition. But then-Chief Justice Reynato Puno was among the seven justices who favored Pimentel's petition.

On July 14, 2007, Pimentel filed an electoral protest to the Senate Electoral Tribunal (SET). After finding grounds for a recount, the SET proceeded with the protest.

In July 2011, former Maguindanao election supervisor Lintang Bedol and suspended Autonomous Region in Muslim Mindanao governor Zaldy Ampatuan revealed that there was massive election fraud during the 2007 election.

On August 11, 2011, the Senate Electoral Tribunal released the final tally: Pimentel got 10,898,786 votes while Zubiri got 10,640,620. Prior to this, on August 3, 2011, Zubiri resigned from the Senate; however, he reiterated that he was not involved in the 2007 electoral fraud.

On August 11, 2011, Pimentel was proclaimed by the Senate Electoral Tribunal as the rightful winner of the 12th senate seat. On August 12, Pimentel took his oath of office before his supporters in Mati, Davao Oriental, where he received a high number of votes.

2013 election
Pimentel was included in the United Nationalist Alliance (UNA) coalition's shortlist of senatorial candidates for the 2013 election. However, citing UNA's senatorial slate now having more than twelve members and the inclusion of his longtime political rival, Juan Miguel Zubiri, Pimentel officially declined his spot in the UNA coalition on June 28, 2012. Instead, Pimentel ran under the Team PNoy coalition, composed mostly of supporters of then-President Benigno Aquino III. Pimentel was elected to the  Senate of the Philippines, placing eighth with 14,725,114 votes.

Senate President (2016–2018)

On July 25, 2016, the opening day of the 17th Congress of the Philippines, Pimentel was elected as Senate President with 20 out of 23 senators voting in his favor. He, along with his father Aquilino Pimentel Jr., is the only father-and-son tandem being elected as Senate President in Philippine history; the elder Pimentel served as Senate President from 2000 to 2001.

In November 2016, Pimentel told Palace Communications Secretary Martin Andanar, "Review your history.", after Andanar referred to anti-Marcos protesters who opposed the hero's burial of the late dictator as "temperamental brats". Pimentel called the protestors "principled", adding that "they come from the poorest sectors of society and therefore, cannot be labeled as "brats. They can never be called brats. These are actually principled positions. So Martin Andanar should review his history,"

In May 2017, Pimentel led 15 senators who supported Proclamation No. 216 which placed the whole of Mindanao under Martial Law. Pimentel also led 12 senators who voted against Resolution 390 calling on Congress to convene a joint session to tackle the declaration of martial law in Mindanao. This opinion was contradicted by Pimentel's father and former Senate President, Nene Pimentel, who posited, "Within 48 hours from declaration of martial law, President [Rodrigo] Duterte is obligated to submit his report in writing or in person before the Senate and the House in joint session".

Pimentel resigned on May 21, 2018, in order to focus on his reelection bid in the 2019 and was succeeded by Majority Leader Tito Sotto.

COVID-19 quarantine protocol breach (2020–2021) 
On March 25, 2020, Pimentel announced that he tested positive for coronavirus disease 2019 (COVID-19), amid the pandemic in the Philippines. Earlier on March 12, multiple senators began practicing self-quarantine as a precaution against the virus, and also because one of the resource persons who attended the Senate session on March 5 tested positive for the disease. On March 16, Senator Juan Miguel Zubiri announced that he had tested positive for COVID-19, which marked Pimentel, along with other senators, as "patients under monitoring" (the official designation by the Department of Health, abbreviated as "PUM"). Pimentel took the COVID-19 test on March 20. At the time that Pimentel confirmed his diagnosis, he had visited the Makati Medical Center to accompany his wife. The Makati Medical Center issued a press release criticizing Pimentel for violating the hospital's home quarantine protocol, which required PUMs to self-isolate in order to avoid exposing health professionals and other patients to possible infection. On May 2, 2020, Pimentel considered himself as a "recovered person" as his staff told him after his sample was tested negative for the SARS-Cov-2, but not yet confirmed by the Department of Health.

Referring to his actions in violation of the COVID-19 community quarantine, an editorial column from the Inquirer dated March 27, 2020 labeled him as "the poster boy of entitlement and recklessness". A popular actress and activist, Angel Locsin, expressed regret in endorsing Pimentel during the 2007 elections, calling it a "mortal sin".

The National Bureau of Investigation probed Pimentel over his possible breach of the quarantine protocols. The Department of Justice will issue a subpoena for him regarding the breach sometime in mid-April 2020. Former Universidad de Manila College of Law dean and lawyer Rico Quicho filed a complaint against the senator for allegedly violating Republic Act No. 11332.

On January 21, 2021, the Department of Justice dismissed the case for lack of probable cause the complaint against Pimentel over his alleged quarantine breach. The Prosecutor General said that the complaint was fatally defective as it was relied on hearsay. As a result, Quicho questioned the government's seriousness about implementing protocols amid the COVID-19 pandemic, comparing it to when a fish vendor in Quezon City was violently arrested for not wearing a mask, while government officials like Pimentel are able to get a free pass from violating pandemic protocols.

PDP–Laban dispute
In December 2020, Pimentel nominated Senator Manny Pacquiao as party president. Despite this, Pacquiao was allegedly kept out of party meetings by vice chairperson and Energy secretary Alfonso Cusi, leading to the PDP-Laban dispute in 2021. A faction of party members headed by Cusi ousted Pacquiao as party president and Pimentel as the party executive vice chairperson on July 17, 2021. As a result, Pacquiao and Pimentel organized a new faction. Duterte later on pinned Pimentel for causing the dispute by naming Pacquiao as party president.

2022 elections
Being only halfway through his second full term as Senator, Pimentel was not up for re-election in the 2022 senatorial elections (Senators serve six-year terms, with half being chosen every three years). However, his faction of the PDP-Laban named Pacquiao as their official standard bearer in the 2022 presidential elections. On March 22, 2022, the Cusi wing of PDP-Laban endorsed the presidential candidacy of Bongbong Marcos, drawing criticism from Pimentel, who declared that the Cusi wing are "total strangers" to the founding of the PDP-Laban party, which was established as the opposition to the dictatorship of Marcos's father, Ferdnand Marcos Sr. He subsequently called on members of the Cusi faction to remember the history and principles of PDP-Laban, stating that in these beliefs, "we cannot possibly endorse Ferdinand Marcos Jr".

With a Supreme Court ruling in 1997 ordering the heirs of Ferdinand Marcos Sr. to pay  billion in estate tax returns to the Bureau of Internal Revenue, which has since ballooned to  billion in 2022, Pimentel filed Senate Resolution No. 998 on March 28, 2022, stating an urgent and pressing need for the Senate to look into why the estate tax has remained uncollected for almost 25 years.

Senate Minority Leader
On July 25, 2022, Pimentel was elected as Senate Minority Floor Leader. He is part of the two-member minority bloc in the Senate alongside Risa Hontiveros in the 19th Congress of the Philippines. He, along with his father Aquilino Pimentel Jr., is the second father-and-son tandem to be elected as Senate Minority Floor Leader in Philippine history after Lorenzo Tañada and Wigberto Tañada; the elder Pimentel served as Minority Leader from 2001 to 2002 and from 2004 to 2010. Like his father, Pimentel became Minority Leader after serving as Senate President.

Personal life
His sister, Gwendolyn Pimentel-Gana was appointed in 2015 as a commissioner of the Commission on Human Rights.

In January 2000, Pimentel married 1998 Miss Universe Philippines Jewel May Lobaton, with whom he has two sons. Pimentel and Lobaton began living separately in November 2011, and their marriage was annulled in January 2018.

In May 2013, Pimentel met chef Kathryna Yu, and they married in October 2018 at the Coconut Palace. Supreme Court Associate Justice Antonio Carpio officiated the wedding, while President Rodrigo Duterte, Secretary Bong Go, Senate President Tito Sotto, Senator Manny Pacquiao and former House Speaker Pantaleon Alvarez were principal sponsors. Yu currently heads PDP Cares. During his first wedding anniversary with Yu, Pimentel announced that they were expecting their first child together. Their daughter, Helena, was born on March 29, 2020.

References

External links
 Aquilino Martin “Koko” dela Llana Pimentel III – Senate of the Philippines
 

1964 births
Living people
Ilocano people
20th-century Filipino lawyers
People from Cagayan de Oro
PDP–Laban politicians
Senators of the 18th Congress of the Philippines
Senators of the 17th Congress of the Philippines
Senators of the 16th Congress of the Philippines
Senators of the 15th Congress of the Philippines
Ateneo de Manila University alumni
University of the Philippines Diliman alumni
Presidents of the Senate of the Philippines
21st-century Filipino lawyers
Senators of the 19th Congress of the Philippines